Sugar Tree Knob is an unincorporated community in Cannon County, Tennessee, United States.

Notes

Unincorporated communities in Cannon County, Tennessee
Unincorporated communities in Tennessee